Tororo Rock is a rock formation located in the town of Tororo in the Eastern Region of Uganda. 

It serves as the defining feature of the town. It is also a tourist attraction being climbable in around an hour. The climb involves four ladders up the last sections but the walk does not require any skill. A tour guide is recommended and a small fee is charged to non-nationals (USh 10,000 per person or approximately US$2.75), as of December 2017. On top of the hill is a radio mast and accompanying power substation. Also at the summit are cell towers belonging to the leading telecommunication network companies operating in Uganda, including Airtel Uganda, MTN Uganda and Uganda Telecom. There is also a closed down cable car that has remained unused for a number of years.

Location
The coordinates of the rock are:00 41 06N, 34 11 01E (Latitude:0.6850; Longitude:34.1836).

Overview
It is reported that Tororo Rock is visible from anywhere in Tororo District. There is saying in Tororo: "The Eiffel Tower is to Paris as the magnificent Tororo Rock is to Tororo District". The rock is a major tourist attraction.

Elevation
On the rock's slopes are ancestral caves and various rock paintings. The elevation of Tororo Town averages .

See also
 Tororo
 Tororo District

References

External links
 Images of Tororo Rock

Tororo
Tororo District
Volcanic plugs of Africa
Mountains of Uganda